List of constituent and affiliated colleges/institutes under the University of Dhaka in Bangladesh.

Honours colleges
 Dhaka College(DC)
 Government Titumir College(GTC)
 Eden Mohila College(EMC)
 Government Bangla College(GBC)
 Kabi Nazrul Government College(KNGC)
 Government Shaheed Suhrawardy College(GSSC)
 Begum Badrunnesa Government Girls' College(BBGGC)

Affiliated health sciences institutions

Medical colleges
 Government

 Private

Dental colleges
 Government
 Dhaka Dental College

 Private
 Pioneer Dental College
 City Dental College
 University Dental College
 Sapporo Dental College
 Bangladesh Dental College
 Marks Dental College
 Update Dental College
 Saphena Women’s Dental College & Hospital
 Mandy Dental College

Nursing colleges
 Government
 College of Nursing
 Dhaka Nursing College
 Mymensingh Nursing College
 Barisal Nursing College
 Rajshahi Nursing College
 Chattagram Nursing College
 Rangpur Nursing College
 Sylhet Nursing College
 Dinjapur Nursing College
 Manikganj Nursing College
Shaheed Tajuddin Ahmad Nursing College

 Private
 Enam Nursing College
 Square College of Nursing
 United College of Nursing
 East-West Nursing College
 Kumudini Nursing College
 BIRDEM Nursing College
 CRP Nursing College
 Shaheed Monsur Ali Nursing Institute,Dhaka
 Sheikh Fazilatunnesa Mujib Memorial KPJ Nursing College
 Grameen Caledonian College of Nursing
 Sylhet Women's Nursing College
 Florence College of Nursing, Tangail

Homeopathic, Unani and Ayurvedic colleges
 Government
 Government Homeopathic Medical College & Hospital
 Government Unani and Ayurvedic Medical College & Hospital

 Private
 Bangladesh Homeopathic Medical College (B.H.M.S.) bachelor's degree under Dhaka University.

Medical Institutes 

Government
 Institute of Health Technology (IHT), Dhaka
 Institute of Public Health

 Private
 Bangladesh Institute of Child Health
 State College of Health Sciences, Dhaka
 International medical college, Health technology unit, gazipur
 Institute of Medical Technology, Mirpur-12, Dhaka
 National Institute of Traumatology & Orthopedic Rehabilitation Centre
 Bangladesh Health Professions Institute
 Saic Institute of Medical Technology, Dhaka
 International Institute of Health Sciences (IIHS), Dhaka
 Trauma Institute of Medical Technology, Mirpur Dhaka

Home economic colleges
 Government
 Govt. College of Applied Human Science (Previously, College of Home Economics)

 Private
 National College of Home Economics
 Bangladesh Home Economics College
 Mymensingh Home Economic College
 Akij College of Home Economics

Engineering and technology 
 Government
 Mymensingh Engineering College
 Faridpur Engineering College
 Barisal Engineering College
Public - Private 
 National Institute of Textile Engineering & Research,(NITER)
Private
 Shyamoli Textile Engineering College,(STEC)

 Dhaka Engineering college
 K.M. Humayun Kabir Engineering College

Institutes 
 Confucius Institute
 Dhaka School of Economics (DScE)
 Institute of Disaster Management and Vulnerability Studies
 Institute of Energy (IE)
 Institute of Health Economics
 Institute of Social Welfare and Research
 Institute of Statistical Research and Training

References

University of Dhaka